Bovista paludosa is a species of fungus belonging to the family Lycoperdaceae.

It is native to Eurasia.

References

Lycoperdaceae
Taxa named by Joseph-Henri Léveillé
Fungi of Europe
Fungi of Asia
Fungi described in 1846